Divny (masculine), Divnaya (feminine), or Divnoye (neuter) is the name of several rural localities in Russia:
Divny, Krasnodar Krai, a settlement in Volnensky Rural Okrug of Uspensky District of Krasnodar Krai
Divny, Krasnoyarsk Krai, a settlement in Chulymsky Selsoviet of Novosyolovsky District of Krasnoyarsk Krai
Divny, Rostov Oblast, a settlement in Istominskoye Rural Settlement of Aksaysky District of Rostov Oblast
Divny, Ulyanovsk Oblast, a settlement in Ryazanovsky Rural Okrug of Melekessky District of Ulyanovsk Oblast
Divnoye, Baltiysky District, Kaliningrad Oblast, a settlement in Divny Rural Okrug of Baltiysky District of Kaliningrad Oblast
Divnoye, Gvardeysky District, Kaliningrad Oblast, a settlement in Zorinsky Rural Okrug of Gvardeysky District of Kaliningrad Oblast
Divnoye, Nesterovsky District, Kaliningrad Oblast, a settlement in Ilyushinsky Rural Okrug of Nesterovsky District of Kaliningrad Oblast
Divnoye, Stavropol Krai, a selo in Apanasenkovsky District of Stavropol Krai